Son Woo Hyuk (born 17 December 1983) is a South Korean actor. He participated in the SBS program Miracle Audition in 2011 and won the audition. He played his first main role in SBS daily drama "Shady mom-in-law".

Education 
 Myungshin High School
 Sungkyunkwan University Bachelor of French Literature

Works

Broadcast 
 Miracle Audition (SBS, 2011)

Drama 
 All About My Romance (SBS, 2013) as Park Boo San (Support Role)
 A Tale of Two Sisters (KBS1, 2013)
 Goddess of Marriage (SBS, 2013)
 Thrice Married Woman (SBS, 2013)
 KBS Drama Special-The Unwelcome Guest (KBS2, 2013)
 KBS Drama Special-The Dirge Singer (KBS2, 2014)
 Golden Cross (KBS2, 2014)
 Two Mothers (KBS2, 2014)
 Family Secret (tvN, 2014) as Kim Chi Jung (Support Role)
 Yeah, That's How It Is (SBS, 2016)
 The Bride of Habaek (tvN, 2017)
 Should We Kiss First? (SBS, 2018) as Kim Hyung Joon (Support Role)
 Shady Mom-in-law (SBS, 2019) as Ahn Mansoo (main role)
 River Where the Moon Rises (KBS, 2021) as Taegam (Support Role)

Movies 
 On the Road to SF (2013)
 Tuning Fork (2013) – as Priest – cameo
 The Throne (2015)- as Hong Nak-in
 Delicious Flight (2015) (main role)
 The True Colour of Men (2016)
 Keys to the Heart (2018) – as Eun-Ha's male friend

musicals 
 The Play (2006)
 Heartbeat (2008)
 Romantic Muscle (2016) – as O Han Gil

Awards 
 SBS Miracle Audition Winner

References

1983 births
21st-century South Korean male actors
People from Changwon
South Korean male film actors
South Korean male musical theatre actors
South Korean male television actors
Sungkyunkwan University alumni
Living people